The Gift is the twenty-seventh studio album and a holiday album by country music singer Kenny Rogers. It was released in 1996 via Magnatone Records. The album features a rendition of "Mary, Did You Know?" featuring Wynonna Judd. This version of the song charted at No. 55 on Hot Country Songs in 1997.

Critical reception
Stephen Thomas Erlewine of Allmusic wrote that "it does suffer from uneven material and the occasional indifferent performance. There are enough good moments here to make it worthwhile for hardcore Kenny fans, but not enough to make it of interest to less dedicated listeners."

Track listing

Personnel 
Compiled from The Gift liner notes.

Musicians 
 Kenny Rogers – lead vocals 
 Bobby Ogdin – keyboards (1-4, 6, 9), acoustic piano (5)
 Eugene Golden – keyboards (7)
 Steve Glassmeyer – keyboards (8)
 Warren Hartman – keyboards (8), acoustic piano (8), arrangements (8)
 Don Potter – acoustic guitar (1, 2, 4, 5, 6)
 Larry Byrom – electric guitar (3, 9)
 Dax Browning – electric guitar (6)
 Billy Panda – acoustic guitar (8)
 Michael Rhodes – bass (1)
 Duncan Mullins – bass (2-6, 9)
 Bob Burns – bass (8)
 Paul Leim – drums (1-4, 8, 9)
 Eddie Bayers – drums (5, 6)
 Farrell Morris – percussion (1-5, 8)
 Bergen White – orchestral arrangements (1, 2, 4, 5, 8, 9), choral arrangements (8)
 Larry Cansler – arrangements (7)
 The Nashville String Machine – strings (1, 2, 4, 5, 8, 9)
 Cynthia Wyatt – harp (4, 8, 9)
 Bob Mason – cello (6)
 Jim Grosjean – viola (6)
 Carl Gorodetzky – string contractor (1, 2, 4, 5, 8, 9), violin (6)
 Pamela Sixfin – violin (6)
 Tom McAninch – French horn (2, 8, 9)
 Bobby Taylor – oboe (8), French horn (8)
 Jim Horn – bass flute (8), recorder (8)
 Dennis Good – trombone (8)
 Barry Green – trombone (8)
 Chris McDonald – trombone (8)
 Mike Haynes – trumpet (8)
 Don Sheffield – trumpet (8)
 George Tidwell – trumpet (8)
 Wynonna Judd – duet vocal (1)
 The Katinas – guest vocals (3)
 Austin Cunningham – backing vocals (4)
 Lona Heid – backing vocals (4, 6)
 Glad – duet vocals (7)
 Brandon Conger – children's dialogue (8)
 Megan Dockery – children's choir (8), children's dialogue (8)
 Michael Jones – children's choir (8)
 Kelly Stewart – children's choir (8)
 Sarah Valley – children's dialogue (8)
 Choir on "A Soldier's King", "What a Wonderful Beginning", "It's the Messiah", and "The Chosen One Montage" – Lisa Cochran, Michael Eldred, James Ferguson, Stephanie Hall, Mark Ivey, Marabeth Jordan, Jana King, Ellen Musik, Louis Nunley, Guy Penrod, Lisa Silver and Dennis Wilson

Production 
 Brent Maher  – producer, recording (1-6 & 9), mixing (1-6 & 9)
 Jim McKell – producer, recording, (1-6 & 9), mix assistant (1-6 & 9), mixing (7)
 Jan Greenfield – production assistant 
 Kevin Myers – recording (7)
 Frank Green – additional engineer
 Mills Logan – additional engineer
 Paul Skaife – additional engineer, assistant engineer
 Don Cobb – digital editing
 Carlos Grier – digital editing
 Mills Logan – engineering
 Denny Purcell – mastering
 Carden & Cherry, Inc. – art direction 
 Matthew Barnes – photography 
 Don Mantooth – photography
 Kenny Rogers – liner notes

Studios
 Recorded at Creative Recording, Inc. (Nashville, Tennessee) and 21st Street Recording (Purcellville, Virginia).
 Mixed at Creative Recording, Inc. 
 Mastered at Georgetown Masters (Nashville, Tennessee).

Chart performance

References

Kenny Rogers albums
1996 Christmas albums
Christmas albums by American artists
Albums produced by Brent Maher
Country Christmas albums